Acylaminoacyl-peptidase (acylamino-acid-releasing enzyme, N-acylpeptide hydrolase, N-formylmethionine (fMet) aminopeptidase, alpha-N-acylpeptide hydrolase) is an enzyme. This enzyme catalyses the following chemical reaction

 Cleavage of an N-acetyl or N-formyl amino acid from the N-terminus of a polypeptide

This enzyme is active at neutral pH.

References

External links 
 

EC 3.4.19